Adrián Escudero García (24 November 19277 March 2011) was a Spanish footballer who played as a striker.

He is the second the all-time leading goalscorer for Atlético Madrid with 169 goals, having appeared for the club in 13 La Liga seasons and played in more than 350 official games.

Club career
Escudero arrived at Atlético Madrid in late 1945, from local amateurs Club Deportivo Mediodía. He ended his first season in La Liga with ten games and two goals, but scored in double digits in eight of the following ten campaigns, most notably contributing with 28 goals combined as the Colchoneros won back-to-back national championships in the early 1950s.

On 8 March 1953, Escudero netted Atlético's 1000th goal in the top division, in a 2–3 away loss against Celta de Vigo, through a penalty kick. At the end of 1957–58 he did not have his contract renewed and decided to retire from football, aged only 30.

Escudero continued working with Atlético Madrid in the following years, first as youth team coach then as assistant manager. After the sacking of Rafael García Repullo (his former teammate) early into the 1963–64 season, he was an interim for one round, a 1–2 defeat at Valencia CF on 29 December 1963.

Escudero died on 7 March 2011 in his hometown of Madrid, at the age of 83.

International career
Escudero earned three caps for Spain in three-and-a-half years, his debut coming on 7 December 1952 in a friendly with Argentina played in Madrid (0–1 loss). In his only official appearance, on 17 March 1954, he scored against Turkey for the 1954 FIFA World Cup qualifiers – the third playoff match ended 2–2 in Rome, and the Spaniards were eliminated after a drawing of lots.

International goals

Honours
Atlético Madrid
La Liga: 1949–50, 1950–51
Copa Eva Duarte: 1951
Copa del Generalísimo: Runner-up 1956

Individual
Monchín Triana Trophy: 1956–57

References

External links

1927 births
2011 deaths
Footballers from Madrid
Spanish footballers
Association football forwards
La Liga players
Atlético Madrid footballers
Spain B international footballers
Spain international footballers
Spanish football managers
La Liga managers
Segunda División managers
Atlético Madrid managers
CD Badajoz managers